Kicking the Germ Out of Germany is a 1918 American short comedy film featuring Harold Lloyd. The film is now considered a lost film.

Cast
 Harold Lloyd as The Boy
 Snub Pollard 
 Bebe Daniels 
 Lige Conley (as Lige Cromley)
 Mildred Forbes
 William Gillespie
 Helen Gilmore
 Max Hamburger
 Estelle Harrison
 Lew Harvey
 Wallace Howe
 Bud Jamison
 Dee Lampton
 Oscar Larson
 Maynard Laswell (as M.A. Laswell)
 Grace Madden
 Belle Mitchell
 James Parrott
 Hazel Powell
 Charles Stevenson
 Myrtle Watson
 Noah Young

See also
 Harold Lloyd filmography
 List of lost films

References

External links

Kicking the Germ Out of Germany at SilentEra

1918 films
1918 comedy films
1918 short films
American silent short films
American black-and-white films
Films directed by Alfred J. Goulding
Lost American films
Silent American comedy films
American comedy short films
1918 lost films
Lost comedy films
1910s American films